Heinrich Unkel, O.F.M. or Arnold von Unkel (died 22 Jan 1482) was a Roman Catholic prelate who served as Auxiliary Bishop of Cologne (1481–1482).

Biography
Heinrich Unkel was appointed a priest in the Order of Friars Minor. In 1481, he was appointed during the papacy of Pope Sixtus IV as Auxiliary Bishop of Cologne and Titular Bishop of Cyrene. He died on 22 Jan 1482 before he was installed.

References

External links and additional sources
 (for Chronology of Bishops) 
 (for Chronology of Bishops)  
 (for Chronology of Bishops) 
 (for Chronology of Bishops)  

15th-century German Roman Catholic bishops
Bishops appointed by Pope Sixtus IV
Year of birth unknown
1482 deaths